Octave Marie Joseph Kérim Homberg, Jr. (19 January 1876 – 9 July 1941) was a French diplomat, author, and financier. He was director of the Indo-China Bank.

Biography
He was born on 19 January 1876 in Paris, France to Octave Homberg, Sr. (1844-1907). During World War I he appealed to the United States for loans and participated in the 1915 Anglo-French Financial Commission. He headed the Commission of Bankers and Economists in France in 1917.

In 1920 he founded the Société financière française et coloniale, which he led until early 1931. 

He died on 9 July 1941 in Cannes, France.

External links
Octave Homberg at the Internet Archive
Octave Homberg at the WorldCat

References

French financiers
1876 births
1941 deaths
20th-century French non-fiction writers